Horst Felbermayr Sr. (19 February 1945 – 17 March 2020) was an Austrian industrialist, businessman, and amateur racing driver who participated in six different 24 Hours of Le Mans.

Biography
He was a frequent collaborator with the racing team Proton Competition.

Felbmayr died on 17 March 2020 at the age of 75.

Racing results

24 Hours of Le Mans results

References

External links
 

1945 births
2020 deaths
24 Hours of Le Mans drivers
Austrian racing drivers